The UK Rock & Metal Singles Chart is a record chart which ranks the best-selling rock and heavy metal songs in the United Kingdom. Compiled and published by the Official Charts Company, the data is based on each single's weekly physical sales, digital downloads and streams. In 2017, there were 16 singles that topped the 52 published charts. The first number-one of the year was "Livin' on a Prayer by Bon Jovi. The final number-one single of the year was also "Christmas Time (Don't Let the Bells End)", which spent the last four weeks atop the chart.

The most successful single on the UK Rock & Metal Singles Chart in 2017 was "Can't Stop" by Red Hot Chili Peppers, which hs spent a total of 20 weeks at number one. Royal Blood have been number one for six weeks with two releases, Linkin Park were number one for five weeks with "Numb", Foo Fighters have spent five weeks at number one with "Run" and "The Sky Is a Neighborhood", The Darkness have spent four weeks at number one with "Christmas Time (Don't Let the Bells End)", Guns N' Roses have spent three weeks at number one with "Sweet Child o' Mine", and Thirty Seconds to Mars spent two weeks at number one with "Walk on Water".

Chart history

See also
2017 in British music
List of UK Rock & Metal Albums Chart number ones of 2017

References

External links
Official UK Rock & Metal Singles Chart Top 40 at the Official Charts Company
The Official UK Top 40 Rock Singles at BBC Radio 1

2017 in British music
United Kingdom Rock and Metal Singles
2017